Barindra Kumar Ghosh or Barindra Ghosh, or, popularly, Barin Ghosh (5 January 1880 – 18 April 1959) was an Indian revolutionary and journalist. He was one of the founding members of Jugantar Bengali weekly, a revolutionary outfit in Bengal. Barindra Ghosh was a younger brother of Sri Aurobindo.

Early life
Barindra Ghosh was born at Croydon, near London on 5 January 1880 although his ancestral village was Konnagar in Hooghly District of present-day West Bengal.
His father, Dr. Krishnadhan Ghosh, was a physician and district surgeon. His mother Swarnalata was the daughter of the Brahmo religious and social reformer, scholar Rajnarayan Basu. Revolutionary and a spiritualist in later life, Aurobindo Ghosh was Barindranath's third elder brother. His second elder brother, Manmohan Ghose, was a scholar of English literature, a poet and professor of English at Presidency College, Calcutta and at Dhaka University. He also had an elder sister named Sarojini Ghosh.

Barindranath attended school in Deoghar, and after passing the entrance examination in 1901, joined Patna College. He received military training in Baroda. During this time, (late 19th century – early 20th century) Barin was influenced by Aurobindo and drawn towards the revolutionary movement.

Revolutionary activities 

Barin came back to Kolkata in 1902 and started organising several revolutionary groups in Bengal with the help of Jatindranath Banerjee. In 1906, he started publishing Jugantar, a Bengali weekly and a revolutionary organization named Jugantar soon followed. Jugantar was formed from the inner circle of Anushilan Samiti and it started preparation for armed militancy activities to oust British from Indian soil.

Barin and Jatindranath Mukherjee alias Bagha Jatin were instrumental in the recruitment of many young revolutionaries from across Bengal. The revolutionaries formed the Maniktala group in Maniktala, Kolkata.  It was a secret place where they started manufacturing bombs and collected arms and ammunition.

Following the attempted killing of Kingsford by two revolutionaries Khudiram and Prafulla on 30 April 1908, the police intensified its investigation which led to the arrest of Barin and Aurobindo Ghosh on 2 May 1908, along with many of his comrades. The trial (known as the Alipore Bomb Case) initially sentenced Aurobindo Ghosh, Barin Ghosh and Ullaskar Datta to death. However, the sentence was reduced to life imprisonment, by Deshbandhu Chittaranjan Das and Barin was deported to the Cellular Jail in Andaman in 1909 along with other convicts. In the Cellular Jail, Barin Ghosh was locked up beside Vinayak Damodar Savarkar & he successfully managed to flee Cellular Jail in 1915. But British caught Barin Ghosh again from Puri after Balasore Battle with Bagha Jatin.

Release and later activities 
Barin Ghosh successfully escaped from Cellular Jail & was the only freedom fighter to do so in 1915. He was hiding in Puri during Battle of Balasore, where Bagha Jatin fought the British. Barin Ghosh was caught again from Puri & sent to Cellular Jail Andaman. He was kept under Solitary confinement for 5 long years. During a general amnesty in 1920, Barin was released and returned to Kolkata to start a career in journalism. Soon he left journalism and formed an ashram in Kolkata. He published his memoirs "The tale of my exile - twelve years in Andamans". In 1923, he left for Pondicherry where his elder brother Aurobindo Ghosh had formed the Sri Aurobindo Ashram. He was influenced by Aurobindo towards spirituality and Sadhana. Barin returned to Kolkata in 1929 and again took up journalism. In 1933 he started an English weekly, The Dawn of India. He was associated with the newspaper The Statesman, and in 1950, he became the editor of the Bengali daily Dainik Basumati. Around this time he got married. He died on 18 April 1959.

Works
The following are books by Barindra Ghosh:
 Dvipantarer Banshi
 Pather Ingit
 Amar Atmakatha
 Agnijug
 Rishi Rajnarayan
 The Tale of My Exile
 Sri Aurobindo

Other books
Barindrakumar Ghosh, Pather Ingit, Calcutta, 1337 (Bengali year).
Upendra Nath Bandyopadhyaya, Nirbasiter Atmakatha, Calcutta, 1352 (Bengali year).
RC Majumdar, History of the Freedom Movement in India, II, Calcutta, 1963.

References

External links
 

Anushilan Samiti
Revolutionary movement for Indian independence
Revolutionaries of Bengal during British Rule
1880 births
1959 deaths
Indian newspaper editors
20th-century Indian journalists
Indian revolutionaries
Indian prisoners sentenced to death
Indian prisoners sentenced to life imprisonment
Prisoners and detainees of British India
Indian independence activists from West Bengal